Pengam railway station is situated in Pengam on the Rhymney Line of the Valley Lines network in South Wales. It is also the nearest station to the town of Blackwood and is the 2nd busiest station on the Rhymney Line, after Caerphilly.

Service
In the evenings the service drops to hourly each way and to two-hourly on Sundays (when southbound trains run to ).

External links

Railway stations in Caerphilly County Borough
DfT Category F2 stations
Former Rhymney Railway stations
Railway stations in Great Britain opened in 1858
Railway stations served by Transport for Wales Rail